Gnomic may refer to:

 Gnomic aspect, a grammatical mood or tense expressing a general truth
 Gnomic will, a concept in Eastern Orthodox theology
 Gnomic poetry, a poetic form
 A Gnome (rhetoric) or gnomic saying

See also

 Gnomon
 Gnomonic projection
 Nomic, a game whose rules change during the game